Gramma may refer to:

 An alternate spelling for the word grandma
 Gramma (fish), a genus of fishes in the family Grammatidae
 "Gramma" (short story), a short story by Stephen King, later made into a television film
 "Gramma" (The Twilight Zone), an episode of The New Twilight Zone, based on Stephen King's short story
 An alternate spelling of grama, a name for several grasses of the genus Bouteloua
 A traditional Australian name for butternut squash

See also
 Granma (disambiguation)
 Grama (disambiguation)